Hareut (friendship, fellowship, comradeship in English, here esp. brotherhood in arms) is a Hebrew poem written by Haim Gouri and set to music by Sasha Argov. The song was written a year after the outbreak of the 1948 Arab–Israeli War and commemorates those who fell in the war. The song is often performed at memorial ceremonies.

The song was originally performed by the Chizbatron with Gideon Singer as a soloist. Other well-known performances of the song have been by the NAHAL Entertainment Troupe, and popular singers Shoshana Damari and Yehoram Gaon. Prior to Israel's 60th Independence Day, the song was elected by IDF soldiers on the Army Radio, as their favourite Hebrew song, ranking ahead of the popular Jerusalem of Gold. The song was highly ranked in other competitions.

The song represents the social ideals of the period of the 1947–1949 Palestine war including one's sacrifice for the homeland, the individual's concern for all, and the sanctity of the memory of the fallen.

In the 1990s the song also became identified with the assassination of Yitzhak Rabin. Yitzhak Rabin admitted that this was one of his favourite songs, and it was performed by Shoshana Damari at the Peace Rally at which he was later assassinated. It is regularly performed at ceremonies commemorating the memory of Yitzhak Rabin.

Lyrics

External links 
 Hareut, performed by Yehoram Gaon

Israeli songs
Songs of the 1948 Arab–Israeli War
1949 songs